Allocasuarina thuyoides, commonly known as the horned sheoak, is a shrub of the genus Allocasuarina native to a large area in the Mid West, Wheatbelt, South West and Goldfields-Esperance regions of Western Australia.

It flowers from January to December and produces cones with long spines. A. thuyoides is found heathland, sandplains and foothills and grows in clay or sandy lateritic soils.

Taxonomy
First described as Casuarina thuyoides in 1845 by Friedrich Anton Wilhelm Miquel, it was assigned to the new genus, Allocasuarina, by L.A.S.Johnson, in 1982.

References

External links
  Occurrence data for Allocasuarina thuyoides from The Australasian Virtual Herbarium

thuyoides
Rosids of Western Australia
Fagales of Australia
Taxa named by Friedrich Anton Wilhelm Miquel
Plants described in 1845